Vitus Ashaba (21 April 1943 – 1985) was a Ugandan middle-distance runner. He competed in the men's 1500 metres at the 1972 Summer Olympics.

References

1943 births
1985 deaths
Athletes (track and field) at the 1972 Summer Olympics
Ugandan male middle-distance runners
Ugandan male steeplechase runners
Olympic athletes of Uganda
Place of birth missing